is a Japanese television drama series that aired on Fuji Television and on Kyodo Television in 2010.

It is based on a novel, Freeter, Ie wo Kau written by the Japanese author Hiro Arikawa.

Cast
 Kazunari Ninomiya
 Naoto Takenaka
 Atsuko Asano
 Haruka Igawa

Reception
It won the Series Drama Grand Prix at the 2011 Tokyo Drama Awards and Kazunari Ninomiya won the Award for Best Actor.

References

External links
 
 

2010 Japanese television series debuts
2010 Japanese television series endings
Japanese drama television series
Fuji TV dramas
Television shows based on Japanese novels